Bonneau is a surname. Notable people with the surname include:

Britt Bonneau (born 1971), American college baseball coach
Jacob Bonneau ( 1717–1786), English artist
Jimmy Bonneau (born 1985), Canadian ice hockey player
Paul Bonneau (1918–1995), French composer
Richard Bonneau, American scientist
Stéphane Bonneau (born 1961), Canadian tennis player

See also
Bonneau, South Carolina, town in Berkeley County, South Carolina, United States